Francis Fanello Munthali (born 25 December 1972) is a Malawian former middle-distance runner.

Competing in the men's 800 metres at the 1992 Summer Olympics in Barcelona, Francis finished eighth in heat eight and failed to qualify for the next round. At the 2000 Summer Olympics, he ran in the men's 1500 metres, finishing last in heat one and setting a new national record with a time of 3:46.34. Munthali also featured in both the 1998 and 2002 Commonwealth Games, covering distances from 1500 metres up to the marathon.

After retiring from competitive sports, Francis became the national athletics coach for Malawi.

References

1972 births
Living people
Malawian male middle-distance runners
Olympic athletes of Malawi
Athletes (track and field) at the 1992 Summer Olympics
Athletes (track and field) at the 2000 Summer Olympics
Commonwealth Games competitors for Malawi
Athletes (track and field) at the 1998 Commonwealth Games
Athletes (track and field) at the 2002 Commonwealth Games